The Josutu League was the southernmost league of Inner Mongolia during Qing rule. It occupied land that forms part of the modern-day Chinese provinces of Liaoning, Hebei, and Chifeng in China's Inner Mongolia.

The name of Josutu was named after a place in the Tumed Right Banner, where Mongol princes regularly gathered together to administer inter-banner affairs.

Divisions 
The Josutu League consisted of two ayimag or five banners.
 Tümed  (or Eastern Tümed): two banners
 Tümed Left Banner (Mongghuljin Banner), led by descendants of Jelme
 Tümed Right Wing Banner, led by descendants of the Chinggisid Altan Khan
 Kharachin : three banners, all of which were led by descendants of Jelme
 Kharachin Left Banner
 Kharachin Middle Banner
 Kharachin Right Banner 
In addition, the Khalkha Banner (Tangghud-Khaklha Banner) was split from the Tümed Left Banner in 1913 under the Republic of China.

Dissolution 
The league was dissolved in 1933 by the Manchukuo government. Its territory is now distributed among the modern administrative regions:
 Fuxin County from the Tümed Left Banner.
 Chaoyang County from the Tümed Right Banner.
 Lingyuan (or Jianchang) County from the Kharachin Left Banner.
 Pingquan County annexed a large portion of the Kharachin Right and Middle Banners.
 Jianping County corresponds to an eastern portion of the Kharachin Right and Middle Banners.

There remain two Mongol autonomous counties in Liaoning.
 Some portion of the former Tümed Left Banner became Fuxin Mongol Autonomous County, Fuxin City.
 The remaining portion of the former Kharachin Left Banner became Kharachin Left Wing Mongol Autonomous County, Chaoyang City.

See also 
 Jindandao Incident

References 
 Yamazaki Sōyo 山崎惣與, Manshū-koku chimei daijiten 滿洲國地名大辭典, p.556,758, 1941.

History of Inner Mongolia
History of Liaoning
History of Hebei